Macropeplus may refer to:
 Macropeplus (bug), a genus of true bugs in the family Miridae
 Macropeplus (plant), a genus of plants in the family Monimiaceae